Oscar Peterson Plays Porgy & Bess is a 1959 studio album by Oscar Peterson, playing selections from George Gershwin's 1935 opera, Porgy and Bess.

Track listing
 "I Got Plenty O' Nuttin'" – 6:26
 "I Wants to Stay Here" – 6:22
 "Summertime" – 3:50
 "Oh, Dey's So Fresh and Fine" – 0:55
 "Oh, Lawd, I'm on My Way!" – 2:35
 "It Ain't Necessarily So" (George Gershwin, Ira Gershwin) – 4:01
 "There's a Boat Dat's Leavin' Soon for New York" – 7:13
 "Oh Bess, Oh Where's My Bess?" – 4:56
 "Here Come de Honey Man" – 1:11
 "Bess, You Is My Woman Now" – 3:28

All songs composed by George Gershwin, with all lyrics by Ira Gershwin and Dubose Heyward, unless otherwise indicated.

Personnel
Recorded October 12, 1959, Los Angeles, California:

Performance
 Oscar Peterson - piano
 Ray Brown - double bass
 Ed Thigpen - drums

Production
 Norman Granz - producer
 Batt Brown - assistant producer
 Jon Schapiro
 Aric Lach Morrison
 Benny Green - liner notes
 Suha Gur - mastering
 Michael Lang - supervisor
 David Lau - director, art direction
 Herman Leonard - photography
 Nausica Loukakos - design
 David Stone Martin - artwork
 Phil Schaap - research, restoration

References

1959 albums
Oscar Peterson albums
Verve Records albums
Albums produced by Norman Granz
Albums with cover art by David Stone Martin
Porgy and Bess music recordings